Surrey County Council is the county council administering certain services in the non-metropolitan county of Surrey in England. The council is composed of 81 elected councillors, and in all but one election since 1965 the Conservative Party has held the majority.
The leader of the council is Tim Oliver.

History

Formation
Surrey County Council was created in 1889 by the Local Government Act 1888, which established the county council local government system in England and Wales. It replaced the Surrey Quarter Sessions for local government functions in the administrative county of Surrey. The council was originally headquartered in Newington where the quarter sessions court had been located. However it moved to County Hall, Kingston upon Thames in 1893 as Newington and the part of Surrey that had been in the Metropolitan Board of Works district had become part of the County of London in 1889.

Kingston upon Thames became part of Greater London in 1965, but the headquarters remained there. In November 2019 Surrey County Council announced that the headquarters would relocate to Woking. The move to Woking was scrapped in 2020; a move to Reigate was announced instead. The council held its first full council meeting at its new premises at Woodhatch Place in Reigate in May 2021.

Post-1974
The Local Government Act 1972 led to Surrey becoming a non-metropolitan county.

Responsibilities
The council is responsible for a number of local public services in Surrey. These include the standard responsibilities of county councils in England and Wales such as transport and highway management, waste disposal (but not collection) and education.

District and borough councils
There are 11 borough or district councils that govern at a more local level than Surrey County Council.

Elmbridge Borough Council
Epsom and Ewell Borough Council
Guildford Borough Council
Mole Valley District Council
Reigate and Banstead Borough Council
Runnymede Borough Council
Spelthorne Borough Council
Surrey Heath Borough Council
Tandridge District Council
Waverley Borough Council
Woking Borough Council

Elections

The public have elected a majority of Conservative councillors to its political body since 1965, with one exception — from 1993 to 1997 a status of no overall control in the declared affiliations of councillors prevailed.

The most recent 2021 election altered the composition of the council chamber and committees to a total of: 47 Conservatives, 14 Liberal Democrats, 12 residents association councillors, 4 independent councillora, and 2 councillors each from Labour and the Green Party.

The next elections will take place in May 2025.

Coat of arms

The escutcheon is described as 'Per pale Azure and Sable two Keys in bend wards upwards and outwards bows interlaced Or between in dexter base a Woolpack and in sinister chief a Sprig of Oak fructed Argent', with the badge 'On a Roundel per pale Azure and Sable in chief a Sprig of Oak fructed Argent and in base two Keys [in saltire] wards upwards and outwards Or'. These arms were granted in 1974.

References

 
County councils of England
1889 establishments in England
Local education authorities in England
Local authorities in Surrey
Major precepting authorities in England
Leader and cabinet executives